Petar Radenković (Serbian Cyrillic: Петар Paдeнкoвић; born 1 October 1934) is a retired Serbian football goalkeeper who also played for the Yugoslav national team. He also goes by the name Perica. He is mostly known for his spell with TSV 1860 Munich in Germany, during which he participated, among others, in the inaugural season of the newly formed Bundesliga.

His younger brother Milan Radenković was a musician in the United States. Radenković is also known for "Bin i Radi bin i König", a song recorded by him.

The player is currently the last living member of the Yugoslavia national football team of the 1956 Summer Olympics.

Honours
TSV 1860 Munich
 Bundesliga: 1965–66
 DFB-Pokal: 1963–64
 European Cup Winner's Cup runner-up: 1964–65

References

External links
 

1934 births
Living people
Serbian footballers
Yugoslav footballers
Yugoslavia international footballers
Association football goalkeepers
Red Star Belgrade footballers
OFK Beograd players
TSV 1860 Munich players
Olympic footballers of Yugoslavia
Olympic silver medalists for Yugoslavia
Footballers at the 1956 Summer Olympics
Footballers from Belgrade
Yugoslav First League players
Bundesliga players
Olympic medalists in football
Serbian expatriate footballers
Yugoslav expatriate footballers
Expatriate footballers in West Germany
Yugoslav expatriate sportspeople in West Germany
Medalists at the 1956 Summer Olympics